Joanna Jakimiuk (born 24 August 1975) is a Polish fencer. She competed in the women's individual épée event at the 1996 Summer Olympics.

References

External links
 

1975 births
Living people
Polish female fencers
Olympic fencers of Poland
Fencers at the 1996 Summer Olympics
Sportspeople from Wrocław